Du'a Khalil Aswad (دعاء خليل أسود) (c. 1989 – c. 7 April 2007) was a 17-year-old Iraqi girl of the Yazidi faith who was stoned to death in Bashiqa, Ninawa, northern Iraq in early April 2007, the victim of an honor killing. It is believed that she was killed around 7 April 2007, but the incident did not come to light until video of the stoning, apparently recorded on multiple cell phones, appeared on the Internet. The rumor that the stoning was connected to her alleged conversion to Islam prompted reprisals against Yazidis by Sunnis, including the 2007 Mosul massacre.

Motive
Some reports claim that Aswad was murdered for having converted to Islam to marry an Iraqi Sunni Muslim boy. Other sources instead indicate that Aswad was killed in punishment for being absent from her home one night.

According to a reporter who interviewed Yazidi sources on site,

Asylum and return
Some news agencies reported that Aswad was being sheltered by a Yazidi tribal leader in Bashika in fear of her life until her family persuaded her that she had been forgiven and could return home. Other reports indicate that she was instead given asylum by a local Muslim Sheikh. It is not known whether the same members of her family that convinced her to return home were responsible for her death. It is not clear from the video whether she was ambushed while returning to her home, or if the mob stormed her home and dragged her into the street. Estimates of the number of attackers range from hundreds to one thousand to two thousand men.

Stoning
Aswad was taken to the town square; according to reports she was stripped naked to symbolize that she had dishonored her family and religion. In the video, though stripped from the waist down, she is wearing an orange sport jacket and black underwear, and at least some of the crowd tries to keep her lower body covered with what looks like another jacket. During the stoning, which lasted approximately 30 minutes, Aswad can be seen in the video attempting to sit up and calling for help as the crowd taunts her and repeatedly throws large chunks of rock or concrete on her head. After her death in the town square, Aswad's body was tied behind a car and dragged through the streets. She was buried with the remains of a dog, to disrespect her. Eventually, her body was "exhumed and sent to the Medico-Legal Institute in Mosul so that tests could be performed to see whether she had died a virgin."

Response and retaliation

A protest in Arbil against Aswad's killing attracted hundreds of Kurds who called for an end to honor killings.

It is believed Aswad's murder sparked, or was used as a pretext for, a reprisal attack in Mosul on 22 April in which 23 Yazidis were killed and for which the Islamic State of Iraq claimed responsibility. The same day also witnessed another reprisal attack, claimed by Jamaat Ansar al-Sunna, of a suicide car bomb that targeted the village of Tel Isqof, killing 25 Yazidis and Assyrian Christians.

Both Aswad's murder and the reprisal were condemned by Amnesty International and by the Kurdistan Regional Government which asked the federal government to investigate. Authorities in Northern Iraq have arrested four people in connection with the killing.

The devastating terrorist attacks on the Yazidi towns Kahtaniya and Jazeera in August 2007, carried out by Sunni Muslims and killing at least 800 and wounding another 1,500 people, are said to have been claimed by the killers to be a response to the stoning.

See also
 Stoning of Aisha Ibrahim Duhulow
 Genocide of Yazidis by ISIL
 Murder of Farkhunda
 Femicide
 Honor killing

References

External links
 Video of the stoning

2007 deaths
Filmed executions
Victims of human rights abuses
Yazidis in Iraq
People executed by stoning
Executed Iraqi women
Violence against women in Iraq
21st-century executions by Iraq
2007 murders in Iraq
Yazidi history
Honor killing in Asia